Chunibala Devi (c. 1872–1955) was an Indian character actress best known for her performance in Satyajit Ray's Pather Panchali, where she played the old aunt, Indir Thakrun, to Apu and Durga.

Formerly a theatre actress, Chunibala Devi made her film debut with Bigraha in 1930, though after her second film, Rikta in 1939 she retired. She was brought out of her retirement at the age of 80 by Satyajit Ray to act in the pivotal role of her career. She became the first Indian to win an award in the best actor/actress category in an international film festival, The Manila Film festival, for her role of Indir Thakrun.

She died in Kolkata, of influenza, in 1955, before the release of Pather Panchali, although Ray had been to her house to show her a projection.

Filmography
 Bigraha – The God and the Image (1930)
 Rikta (1939)
 Pather Panchali – Song of the Road (1955)

References

External links
 
 The Making of Pather Panchali

Actresses from Kolkata
Bengali Hindus
1870s births
1955 deaths
19th-century Indian actresses
Bengali actresses
20th-century Indian actresses
Actresses in Bengali cinema